This article serves as an index – as complete as possible – of all the honorific orders or similar decorations awarded by Spain, classified by Monarchies chapter and Republics chapter, and, under each chapter, recipients' countries and the detailed list of recipients.

Awards

MONARCHIES

Spanish Royal Family 
 Juan Carlos I of Spain :
 Sovereign of the Order of the Golden Fleece (Spain)
 Grand Master of the Royal and Distinguished Order of Charles III (Spain)
 Grand Master of the Royal Order of Isabel the Catholic (Spain)
 Grand Master of the Royal and Military Order of Saint Hermenegild (Spain)
 Grand Master of the Royal and Military Order of Saint Ferdinand (Spain)
 Grand Master of the Order of Montesa (Spain)
 Grand Master of the Order of Alcántara (Spain)
 Grand Master of the Order of Calatrava (Spain)
 Grand Master of the Order of Santiago (Spain)
 Knight of the Order of St. Xavier (Spain)
 Queen Sofía of Spain :
 Dame Grand Collar of The Royal and Distinguished Order of Charles III.
 Dame of the Royal Order of Queen Maria Luisa (1,193rd lady on 14 May 1962).
 Felipe, Prince of Asturias :
 Knight of the Order of the Golden Fleece (3 May 1981) (1,182nd Knight)
 Knight of the Collar of the Royal and Distinguished Order of Charles III (24 January 1986)
 Knight Grand Cross of the Order of Military Merit, with white distinctive (7 July 1986)
 Knight Grand Cross of the Order of Naval Merit, with white distinctive (13 July 1987)
 Knight Grand Cross of the Order of Aeronautical Merit, with white distinctive (4 July 1988)
 Knight Grand Cross of the Royal and Military Order of Saint Hermenegild (30 April 1999)
 Letizia, Princess of Asturias : Grand Cross of the Order of Charles III on 21 May 2004.
 Infanta Elena, Duchess of Lugo 
 Grand Cross of the Order of Isabella the Catholic
 Infanta Cristina : 
 Grand Cross of the Order of Isabella the Catholic
 Grand Cross of the Order of Charles III
 Iñaki Urdangarin : Grand Cross of the Spanish Royal Order of Sports Merit (Real Orden del Mérito Deportivo)
 Infanta Pilar, Duchess of Badajoz : 
 1,191st Dame of the Royal Order of Queen Maria Luisa on 16 April 1936.
 Grand Cross of the Order of Charles III
 Infanta Margarita, 2nd Duchess of Hernani :
 1,192nd Dame of the Royal Order of Queen Maria Luisa on 6 March 1957.
 Grand Cross of the Order of Charles III
 Grand Cross of the Order of Alfonso X the Wise (2003)
 Carlos Zurita, Duke of Soria
 Grand Cross of the Order of Alfonso X the Wise (2003)
 Infanta Alicia, Dowager Duchess of Calabria : Dame of the Royal Order of Maria Luisa
 Infante Carlos, Duke of Calabria : Knight of the Order of the Golden Fleece

European monarchies

British Royal Family 

 The Queen : 
 Dame Collar of the Order of Charles III (19 October 1986)
 Lady of the Order of the Golden Fleece (1988)
 The Prince of Wales : Grand Cross of the Order of Charles III (19 October 1986)

Norwegian Royal Family 
See also decorations pages (mark °) : Harald, Sonja, Haakon, Mette-Marit, Mârtha Louise, Astrid & Ragnhild

 Harald V of Norway:
 1,192nd Knight and Collar of the Order of the Golden Fleece in 1995°
 Grand Cross with Collar of the Order of Charles III°
 Queen Sonja of Norway:
 Grand Cross of the Order of Charles III °
 Dame Grand Cross of the Order of Isabella the Catholic°
 Haakon, Crown Prince of Norway: Knight Grand Cross of the Order of Charles III °
 Mette-Marit, Crown Princess of Norway: Dame Grand Cross of the Order of Isabella the Catholic°
 Princess Märtha Louise of Norway: Grand Cross of the Order of Civil Merit°
 Princess Astrid of Norway: Dame Grand Cross of the Order of Isabella the Catholic°

Swedish Royal Family   

 Carl XVI Gustaf of Sweden : 
 Knight of the Order of the Golden Fleece (1,183rd member, 1983) 
 Grand Cross Collar of the Order of Charles III
 Queen Silvia of Sweden : Grand Cross of the Order of Isabella the Catholic

Danish Royal Family 

 Margrethe II of Denmark : 
 Lady of the Order of the Golden Fleece 
 Dame Collar of the Order of Charles III
 Princess Benedikte of Denmark : Grand Cross of the Order of Isabella the Catholic

Dutch Royal Family 
 King Willem-Alexander of the Netherlands : Knight Grand Cross of the Order of Isabella the Catholic (2001)
 Queen Máxima of the Netherlands :  Dame Grand Cross of the Order of Isabella the Catholic (2001)
 Princess Beatrix of the Netherlands :
 Lady of the Order of the Golden Fleece (1,187th Member, since 07/10/1985)
 Dame Grand Cross of the Order of Isabella the Catholic (15 March 1980)
 Princess Margriet of the Netherlands : Dame Grand Cross of the Order of Isabella the Catholic (15 March 1980)
 Pieter van Vollenhoven : Knight Grand Cross of the Order of Isabella the Catholic (15 March 1980)

Belgian Royal Family 

 King Philippe : Grand Cross of the Order of Isabella the Catholic (2000) 
 Queen Mathilde : Grand Cross of the Order of Isabella the Catholic (2000)
 King Albert II : 
 Knight of the Order of the Golden Fleece 
 Knight Grand Cross of the Order of Charles III
 Queen Paola : Grand Cross of the Order of Charles III
 Princess Astrid & Prince Lorenz : Grand-Cross of the Order of Civil Merit (2000)
 Prince Laurent : Grand-Cross of the Order of Civil Merit (2000)
 Princess Claire :  None (not yet a princess in 2000)

Luxembourgish Grand-Ducal Family 
 Henri, Grand Duke of Luxembourg : 
 Knight of the Order of the Golden Fleece
 Grand Cross with Collar of the Order of Charles III
 Maria Teresa, Grand Duchess of Luxembourg : Grand Cross of the Order of Charles III

Asian monarchies

Jordanian Royal Family 
 Queen Noor of Jordan : Knight Grand Cross The Order of Isabella the Catholic
 Abdullah II of Jordan  : 
 Grand Cross with Collar of the Order of Charles III (21.4.2006) 
 Grand Cross with Collar of the Order of Isabel the Catholic (1999) 
 Grand Cross of the Military Merit in white of Spain (15.9.1995) 
 Queen Rania of Jordan : 
 Grand Cross with Collar of the Order of Charles III (21.4.2006) 
 Grand Cross of the Order of Isabella the Catholic (18.10.1999)
 Princess Alia bint Al Hussein, daughter of Queen Dina of Jordan, half-sister of Abdullah II of Jordan : Grand Cross of the Order of Isabella the Catholic (11.11.1994) 
 Sayyid Mohammed Al-Saleh, Princess Alia's 2nd husband : Grand Cross of the Order of Civil Merit (18.10.1999) 
 Prince Faisal bin Al Hussein, son of Princess Muna of Jordan, full-blood brother of Abdullah II of Jordan : Knight Grand Cross of the Order of Isabella the Catholic (26.5.2006) 
 Princess Alia, Faisal's former wife : Dame Grand Cross of the Order of Isabella the Catholic (26.5.2006) 
 Prince Ali Bin Al-Hussein, son of Queen Alia of Jordan, half-brother of Abdullah II of Jordan : Knight Grand Cross of the Order of Isabella the Catholic 
 Princess Ghida Talal, Prince Talal's wife : Dame Grand Cross of the Order of Isabella the Catholic 
 Basma bint Talal, sister of  King Hussein I of Jordan : Dame Grand Cross of the Order of Isabella the Catholic (21.10.1999) 
 Colonel Timoor al-Daghistani, Basma bint Talal's first husband  : Knight Grand Cross of the Order of Isabella the Catholic (21.10.1999)

Thai Royal Family 

 King Maha Vajiralongkorn of Thailand : Grand Cross of the Royal and Distinguished Order of Charles III
 Queen Sirikit of Thailand :
 Knight Grand Cross of The Order of Isabella the Catholic (1960)
 Grand Cross of the Royal and Distinguished Spanish Order of Charles III (1987)
 Princess Sirindhorn of Thailand : Knight Grand Cross of the Order of Isabella the Catholic, 1987
 Princess Chulabhorn Walailak of Thailand : Knight Grand Cross of The Order of Isabella the Catholic, 1987

Japanese Imperial Family 

 Emperor Naruhito : Grand Cross of the Order of Charles III
 Empress Masako : Knight Grand Cross of the Order of Isabella the Catholic
 Emperor Emeritus Akihito : 
 Knight of the Order of the Golden Fleece 
 Collar of the Order of Charles III
 Empress Emerita Michiko : Grand Cross of the Order of Charles III
 Crown Prince Akishino : Knight Grand Cross of the Order of Isabella the Catholic
 Crown Princess Akishino (Kiko) : Knight Grand Cross of the Order of Isabella the Catholic
 Princess Takamado (Hisako) : Knight Grand Cross of the Order of Isabella the Catholic

Nepalese Royal Family 

 King Birendra :Collar of the Order of Charles III
 Aishwarya of Nepal :Collar of the Order of Charles III
 Gyanendra of Nepal :Knight Grand Cross of the Order of Isabella the Catholic

See also 
 Mirror page : List of honours of the Spanish Royal Family by country

References 

 
Spain